Saint-Christophe is a commune in the Charente department in southwestern France.  It is a member of the Charente Limousine group of coummunes bordering Haute-Vienne.  It is located 14  km from Confolens and 67 km northeast of Angoulême .

The village is also 5  km east of Lesterps , 13  km north of Saint-Junien , 18  km north-east of Chabanais , 21  km south-west of Bellac and 37  km north- west of Limoges [ 2 ] .

The main road in the commune is the D 82 route from Confolens and Lesterps to Limoges via Oradour-sur-Glane , which crosses it from west to east. The village is also served by the D 163 which goes south-west to Chabanais, and the D 330 south to Brigueuil and Saint-Junien [ 3 ] .

The nearest station is Saint-Junien , served by TER trains to Angoulême and Limoges .

Population

See also
Communes of the Charente department

References

Communes of Charente
Charente communes articles needing translation from French Wikipedia